Leifsbudir (Old Norse: Leifsbuðir) was a settlement, mentioned in the Greenland Saga, founded by Leif Eriksson in 1000 or 1001 in Vinland.

Later, 160 Greenlanders, including 16 women, established themselves there under the leadership of Norseman Thorfinn Karlsefni, the first European to come into contact with the local Skrælings, or American Indians. Karlsefni's son, Snorri Thorfinnsson, is believed to have been the first child of European descent to be born in North America outside of Greenland. However the settlement was a temporary one—the settlers were forced to abandon Leifsbudir due to a lack of trade with natives and return to Greenland.

Leifsbudir is believed by some scholars (both historians and archaeologists) to have been located at L'Anse aux Meadows in Newfoundland.

See also 
Skálholt

References

History of Greenland
History of North America
History of Newfoundland and Labrador by location
Leif Erikson
Vinland